Abs is a German surname. Notable people with the surname include:

Hermann Josef Abs (1901–1994), German banker
Johann Christian Josef Abs (1781–1823), German educator
Carl Abs (1851–1895), German sportsman

German-language surnames